Sirens is the second full-length studio album released by Buffalo-based metalcore band It Dies Today, released on October 17, 2006. It is the last recorded material with ex-vocalist Nick Brooks. Since his departure, the band's current vocalist, Jason Wood has re-recorded "Sixth of June" and "Through Leaves, Over Bridges". These songs are available on their official Myspace.

Sirens was leaked to peer-to-peer file sharing programs on August 15, 2006.

Track listing

"Sixth of June" is about Aileen Wuornos. In early press and on the leaked version it is referred to as "Damsel of Death". It was featured on the soundtracks of Arena Football: Road to Glory & Resident Evil: Extinction.
"Through Leaves, Over Bridges" is about Kurt Vonnegut's "Long Walk to Forever". It imitates the story, but appears to change the ending.
"On the Road (To Damnation)" is about the Four Horsemen of the Apocalypse.
"Sacred Heart" was featured briefly in the film Jennifer's Body.

Credits

Band
Nick Brooks - vocals, co-production
Chris Cappelli - guitar
Mike Hatalak - guitar, co-production
Steve Lemke - bass guitar
Nick Mirusso - drums

Other
GGGarth - production
Ben Kaplan - production, recording
Josh Wilbur - mixing
Howie Weinberg - mastering
Judah Nero - pre-production
David Schrott - photography
Kevin Estrada - band photography
Sons of Nero - artwork

References

It Dies Today albums
2006 albums
Trustkill Records albums
Albums with cover art by Sons of Nero